Lækjartorg ("brook square") is a square in downtown Reykjavík, Iceland. It is located in Kvosin south of Reykjavík Harbor, where Bankastræti, Lækjargata and Austurstræti meet. Reykjavík District Court faces the square.

References

Geography of Reykjavík
Tourist attractions in Iceland